Kemble may refer to:

Places
 Kemble, Gloucestershire, a village in England
 Kemble railway station
 Cotswold Airport (formerly Kemble Airfield and RAF Kemble)
 Kemble Air Show, former name of the Cotswold Air Show
 Kemble, Ontario, Canada
 Battery Kemble Park, Washington, DC, United States

People
 Adelaide Kemble (1815–1879), opera singer
 Arthur Kemble (1862–1925), English cricketer and rugby union player
 C. C. Kemble (born 1831), American architect
 Charles Kemble (1775–1854), British actor
 E. W. Kemble (1861–1933), illustrator of Mark Twain books
 Edwin C. Kemble (1889–1984), American physicist
 Fanny Kemble (1809–1893), English actress who became a writer and an anti-slavery activist
 Gary Kemble, New Zealand rugby league footballer and coach
 Gouverneur Kemble (1786–1875), American ironmaster
 Henry Kemble (actor, born 1848) (1848–1907), actor
 Henry Stephen Kemble (1789–1836), British actor
 John Kemble (martyr) (1599–1679), English Roman Catholic martyr
 John C. Kemble (1800–1843), New York politician
 John H. Kemble (1912–1990), American maritime historian
 John Mitchell Kemble (1807–1857), scholar of Old English
 John Philip Kemble (1757–1823), British actor
 Lillian Kemble, American stage and silent film actress
 Maria Theresa Kemble (1774–1832), English actress and playwright
 Myra Kemble (1857–1906), Australian actress
 Penn Kemble (1941–2005), American political activist
 Priscilla Kemble (1756–1845), English actress
 Roger Kemble (1721–1802), English theatre manager and actor
 Stephen Kemble (1758–1822), English theatre director and actor

Other uses
 Kemble family, a family of English actors and operatic singers

See also
 Kemball